Belarus competed at the 2016 Summer Paralympics in Rio de Janeiro, Brazil, from 7 to 18 September 2016.  They delegated 20 athletes (10 men, 10 women) to the Summer Paralympics. They competed in athletics, judo, rowing, swimming and wheelchair fencing.

Disability classifications

Every participant at the Paralympics has their disability grouped into one of five disability categories; amputation, the condition may be congenital or sustained through injury or illness; cerebral palsy; wheelchair athletes, there is often overlap between this and other categories; visual impairment, including blindness; Les autres, any physical disability that does not fall strictly under one of the other categories, for example dwarfism or multiple sclerosis. Each Paralympic sport then has its own classifications, dependent upon the specific physical demands of competition. Events are given a code, made of numbers and letters, describing the type of event and classification of the athletes competing. Some sports, such as athletics, divide athletes by both the category and severity of their disabilities, other sports, for example swimming, group competitors from different categories together, the only separation being based on the severity of the disability.

Medalists

Athletics  

Men
Field events

Women
Field events

Judo

Men

Women

Rowing 

One pathway for qualifying for Rio involved having a boat have top eight finish at the 2015 FISA World Rowing Championships in a medal event.  Belarus qualified for the 2016 Games under this criteria in the AS Women's Single Sculls event with a fifth-place finish in a time of 05:38.39.

Swimming 

The top two finishers in each Rio medal event at the 2015 IPC Swimming World Championships earned a qualifying spot for their country for Rio. Ihar Boki earned Belarus a spot after winning gold in the Men's 50m Freestyle S13.

Men

Women

Wheelchair fencing

Men

Women

See also
Belarus at the Paralympics
Belarus at the 2016 Summer Olympics

References

Nations at the 2016 Summer Paralympics
2016
2016 in Belarusian sport